Antoine "Tony" Garceran (born 7 February 1950) is a French former professional footballer who played as a defender and midfielder.

Honours 
Valenciennes
 Division 2: 1971–72

References

External links 
 
 

1950 births
Living people
Sportspeople from Béziers
French footballers
Association football defenders
Association football midfielders
AS Béziers Hérault (football) players
Valenciennes FC players
Stade de Reims players
Paris Saint-Germain F.C. players
Gazélec Ajaccio players
Ligue 2 players
Championnat de France Amateur (1935–1971) players
Ligue 1 players
French Division 3 (1971–1993) players
Footballers from Occitania (administrative region)